Linsley Thorpe (15 February 1923 – 19 June 2009) was an Australian cricketer. He played in eight first-class matches for Queensland between 1957 and 1959.

See also
 List of Queensland first-class cricketers

References

External links
 

1923 births
2009 deaths
Australian cricketers
Queensland cricketers
Cricketers from Queensland